Election will be held in Soccsksargen for seats in the House of Representatives of the Philippines on May 9, 2016.

Summary

Cotabato
Each of Cotabato's three legislative districts will elect each representative to the House of Representatives. The candidate with the highest number of votes wins the seat.

1st District
Jesus N. Sacdalan is the incumbent.

2nd District
Nancy A. Catamco is the incumbent.

3rd District
Jose I. Tejada is the incumbent.

Sarangani
Superstar boxer Manny Pacquiao is the incumbent but not seeking for reelection. He is running for senate instead.

South Cotabato
Each of South Cotabato's two legislative districts will elect each representative to the House of Representatives. The candidate with the highest number of votes wins the seat.

1st District
Pedro B. Acharon Jr. is the incumbent.

2nd District
Ferdinand L. Hernandez is the incumbent.

Sultan Kudarat
Each of Sultan Kudarat's two legislative districts will elect each representative to the House of Representatives. The candidate with the highest number of votes wins the seat

1st District
Raden C. Sakaluran is the incumbent but not seeking for reelection. He is running for vice-governor instead.

2nd District
Arnold F. Go is the incumbent but ineligible for reelection due to term limit. His party nominated his wife Amelia Go.

References

External links
COMELEC - Official website of the Philippine Commission on Elections (COMELEC)
NAMFREL - Official website of National Movement for Free Elections (NAMFREL)
PPCRV - Official website of the Parish Pastoral Council for 
Responsible Voting (PPCRV)

2016 Philippine general election
Lower house elections in Soccsksargen